KPOJ (620 AM) is a radio station serving the Portland metropolitan area in the U.S. state of Oregon and neighboring Washington. It airs a sports format, and is affiliated with Fox Sports Radio.  Its transmitter is located in Sunnyside, Oregon, and its studios are in Tigard, Oregon. The station is owned by iHeartMedia.

History

KGW

On December 1, 1921, the U.S. Department of Commerce, in charge of radio at the time, adopted a regulation formally establishing a broadcasting station category, which set aside the wavelength of 360 meters (833 kHz) for entertainment broadcasts, and 485 meters (619 kHz) for market and weather reports. On March 21, 1922, the Oregonian Publishing Company, which published The Oregonian, was issued a license for a new Portland station with the randomly assigned call letters KGW, transmitting on the 360 meter entertainment wavelength. The station began regular broadcasting at noon on March 25, 1922, debuting with singing by Chicago Grand Opera soprano Edith Mason, following test transmissions begun a few days earlier.

The station's studios and transmitter were located in the Oregonian Building from 1922 until 1943, when a fire destroyed them, and the station moved to other quarters. In late September 1922, the Department of Commerce set aside a second entertainment wavelength, 400 meters (750 kHz) for "Class B" stations that had quality equipment and programming, and KGW was assigned use of this more exclusive wavelength. In early 1923 the station received an additional authorization to broadcast weather reports on 485 meters.

In May 1923 additional "Class B" frequencies were made available, which included a Portland allocation for 610 kHz (492 meters), with KGW exclusively  assigned to this frequency. On November 11, 1928, as part of the implementation of a major nationwide reallocation under the provisions of the Federal Radio Commission's General Order 40, KGW was assigned to a "regional" frequency, 620 kHz.

KGW affiliated with the NBC network in 1927 and stayed for 29 years until joining ABC Radio in 1956. Among KGW's early personalities was Mel Blanc, a local musician and vocalist featured on the "Hoot Owls" variety program from 1927 to 1933. Here, Blanc discovered a talent for character voices that would win him stardom as the voice of Bugs Bunny, Daffy Duck and many other Warner Brothers cartoon features.

Under The Oregonian the station gained an AM sister, KEX, in 1933, and the Northwest's first FM station, KGW-FM (now KKRZ), in 1946. In 1957 the station was sold to King Broadcasting. King Broadcasting founded KGW-TV in 1956. All three stations continue to exist in Portland, but none have any remaining connection to AM 620. KGW would flip to Top 40 on January 9, 1959.

"62 KGW", as it called itself during its later years, was one of the most popular radio stations in Portland in the 1960s and 1970s, but its ratings declined during the 1980s, despite a shift to adult contemporary music and on July 28, 1989, the station changed to a talk format, using primarily local hosts. The change did not produce the hoped-for ratings turnaround, and on July 26, 1991, the talk programming was replaced by a simulcast of sister station KINK-FM's programming, but retaining the longstanding and locally well-known call sign, KGW, until March 1, 1993, when the call letters were changed to KINK.

Post-1993
On February 6, 1995, KINK changed back to all-talk, now airing nationally syndicated talk radio programming instead of local talk, and the call letters changed to KOTK.  The frequent changing of call letters continued, with the station becoming KEWS ("K-News") in 1997, KDBZ ("The Buzz") in 2000, and KTLK ("K-Talk") in 2002. On July 25, 2003, the station flipped to oldies, with the current KPOJ call letters adopted on August 18. For many years and with various formats, the station called itself "Super 62".

The KPOJ call sign originated at what is now KKPZ AM 1330, which for many years was the Mutual Broadcasting System's Portland affiliate.  In the 1970s, that station changed its call letters to KUPL.  The call letters stand for Portland Oregon Journal, the now-defunct newspaper that once owned AM 1330.

On March 31, 2004, KPOJ flipped to progressive talk. The station was one of the first Air America affiliates, when the political talk network launched in that same month, running the standard Air America rotation of Marc Maron's "Morning Sedition" and other shows featuring Rachel Maddow, Al Franken, Randi Rhodes, Mike Malloy and others, serving as broadcast home for Thom Hartmann with Carl Wolfson and Christine Alexander doing a locally focused morning show for a time.

The progressive talk format was replaced by sports talk at 5:30 PM on November 9, 2012, three days after the 2012 general election. Fans of the progressive talk radio format immediately started a campaign to "Save KPOJ", with thousands of listeners signing a petition to Clear Channel.

In 2013, KPOJ became the flagship station of the Portland Trail Blazers, replacing sister station KEX. The station had already aired some Blazers games during the 2012–13 season if there were conflicts with KEX's broadcasts of the Oregon State Beavers.

On April 14, 2014, KPOJ rebranded as "Rip City Radio 620" (the name is based on a nickname for the city inspired by the Blazers.)
Rip City Radio is a Fox Sports Radio affiliate, carrying The Rich Eisen Show from 9am-12pm Pacific as well as Jay Mohr Sports from 12pm-3pm Pacific.  In March 2015 a local morning drive show was added, "Rip City Mornings" with Andy Bunker and Taylor Danforth.  Travis Demers was brought in to host the afternoon drive show "The Rip City Drive" in October 2015.  Dan Sheldon and Nigel Burton took over hosting the morning show on September 1, 2016.  Chad Doing was added to the afternoon show on March 20, 2017.

Partnership with NBC Sports Northwest
On January 14, 2018, Rip City Radio announced a partnership with NBC Sports Northwest, formerly Comcast SportsNet Northwest.  The lineup included a television simulcast of Rip City Mornings with Dan Sheldon and Nigel Burton from 6-9 AM Pacific time, and the Rip City Drive with Travis Demers and Chad Doing 3-6 PM Pacific.  A new mid-day show with Dwight Jaynes and Aaron Fentress was added from 12-3 PM.  In July 2018, the Brian Noe Show replaced Dwight and Aaron.  The partnership also included adding a radio simulcast to shows originated by NBC Sports Northwest including 'Talkin Beavers', 'Talkin Ducks', 'The Bridge', and 'Outdoor GPS'.

Previous logo
  (KPOJ's logo under previous progressive talk format)

References

External links
KPOJ Website

FCC History Cards for KPOJ (covering 1927-1980 as KGW)

POJ
Sports radio stations in the United States
Radio stations established in 1922
1922 establishments in Oregon
The Oregonian
IHeartMedia radio stations
Radio stations licensed before 1923 and still broadcasting
Fox Sports Radio stations